The 2013 Texas Tech Red Raiders football team represented Texas Tech University in the 2013 NCAA Division I FBS football season as members of the Big 12 Conference. Kliff Kingsbury led the Red Raiders in his first season as the program's fifteenth head coach. The Red Raiders played home games on the university's campus in Lubbock, Texas at Jones AT&T Stadium.

At the end of the 2012 regular season, Head coach Tommy Tuberville resigned to take the same position with the Cincinnati Bearcats. Former Red Raider quarterback, Houston Cougars offensive coordinator, and Texas A&M Aggies offensive coordinator Kliff Kingsbury was hired as the new head coach prior to the 2013 season.

Following the conclusion of the regular season, the Associated Press named tight end Jace Amaro, offensive tackle Le'Raven Clark, and linebacker Will Smith to their first team selections. Defensive tackle Kerry Hyder and wide receiver Eric Ward were selected for the second team. Jace Amaro additionally earned Unanimous All-American honors from many organizations and broke the single season tight end receiving yards record in a 37–23 upset over #14 Arizona State in the 2013 Holiday Bowl. Despite having two true freshman quarterbacks start every game, the Red Raiders ended the season as the number-two-ranked passing offense in the NCAA Football Bowl Subdivision (FBS) with 392.8 yards per game, just behind Fresno State's 394.8 yards per game.

Preseason

Award watch lists 
 Outland Trophy – Kerry Hyder, Le'Raven Clark
 Bronko Nagurski Trophy – Kerry Hyder
 Lombardi Award – Kerry Hyder, Le'Raven Clark
 Fred Biletnikoff Award – Eric Ward, Jace Amaro
 Earl Campbell Tyler Rose Award – Eric Ward
 Ted Hendricks Award – Kerry Hyder

Preseason All-Big 12 
 TE Jace Amaro
 WR Eric Ward
 OL Le'Raven Clark
 DL Kerry Hyder

Coaching changes 
Head coach/OC: Kliff Kingsbury replaces Tommy Tuberville and offensive coordinator Neal Brown
Defensive coordinator: Matt Wallerstedt replaces Art Kaufman
Linebackers: Mike Smith (additionally Co-DC) replaces Robert Prunty
Outside Receivers: Sonny Cumbie (additionally promoted to Co-OC) replaces Tommy Mainord
Inside Receivers: Eric Morris(additionally Co-OC) replaces Sonny Cumbie
Defensive line: John Scott, Jr., replaces Fred Tate
Offensive line: Lee Hays replaces Chris Thomsen
Defensive backs/safeties: Trey Haverty and Kevin Curtis replace John Lovett and Robert Prunty
Running backs: Mike Jinks replaces Chad Scott
Special teams: Trey Haverty replaces Tommy Tuberville
Strength and Conditioning: Chad Dennis replaces Joe Walker

Schedule 

Denotes the largest crowd to watch a football game at Jones AT&T Stadium

Roster

Game summaries

at SMU 

Texas Tech named walk-on true freshman quarterback Baker Mayfield as the starter at the position, marking the first season opening start by a true freshman in school history and the first walk-on freshman to start a season opener for a BCS team. In the victory, Mayfield completed 43 of 60 passes for 413 yards and four touchdowns (to Jordan Davis, Bradley Marquez, Jakeem Grant, and Reginald Davis), and he also ran for a touchdown in the second half. Mayfield's performance came close to breaking the Texas Tech single game freshman passing yard record set by Billy Joe Tolliver, and was only 4 completions away from the NCAA record for single game pass completions by a freshman. Mayfield was named Big 12 Offensive Player of the Week for his performance.

Stephen F. Austin 

In the first home game under head coach Kliff Kingsbury, the Red Raiders dominated the FCS team from Stephen F. Austin. The start of the game was delayed by lightning in the Lubbock area. Texas Tech ended up with 731 yards of total offense as Baker Mayfield threw for 367 yards before being replaced by Davis Webb in the second half. Mayfield threw touchdown passes to Jakeem Grant, Jace Amaro, and Bradley Marquez, and Kenny Williams added a pair of first-quarter touchdown passes. DeAndre Washington and Quinton White added rushing touchdowns, and Webb threw a TD strike to Reginald Davis for the Red Raiders' final touchdown. Texas Tech broke the student attendance record with 14,915 students, almost half of the school's enrollment.

TCU 

In a Thursday night nationally televised game, the 2–0 Red Raiders faced the 1–1 Texas Christian University Horned Frogs in the opening Big 12 game for both schools. Lightning near Jones AT&T Stadium forced a delay in the kickoff for the second straight game.  Texas Tech got in the scoring column first with a touchdown pass from Baker Mayfield to Kenny Williams, who took the ball 50 yards down the right sideline for the score. Texas Tech's Ryan Bustin added a 39-yard field goal to make the score 10–0 in the first quarter. Neither team scored in the second quarter. TCU got a field goal in the third quarter, and tied the score midway through the fourth quarter on a touchdown run by B.J. Catalon. An apparent punt return for a touchdown by TCU's Brandon Carter was taken away earlier in the fourth quarter after officials ruled that he had signaled a fair catch on the play. Mayfield suffered a leg injury in the second half, and Davis Webb came in at quarterback for the Red Raiders with the score tied late in the game. Webb threw what looked to be a go-ahead touchdown pass to DeAndre Washington, but officials ruled that Washington dropped the ball just short of the goal line and the touchdown was taken off the scoreboard. Webb then threw a perfect 19-yard touchdown pass to Bradley Marquez to give the Red Raiders a 17–10 lead with 3:48 remaining. Texas Tech's defense forced TCU to punt on their next possession, and the Red Raiders drove into scoring position for Ryan Bustin to add a 37-yard field goal to make the final score 20–10. Mayfield threw for 216 yards before his injury, but was intercepted three times. Jace Amaro caught 9 passes for 97 yards during the Texas Tech victory. A student attendance record of 16,092 was set during the TCU game, breaking the record of 14,915 set just one week earlier, with an overall attendance of 58,701 for the game. Texas Tech made its debut into the Associated Press Top 25 following the win over the Horned Frogs, who were playing with star defensive end Devonte Fields, who had been suspended for parts of the first two games.

Texas State 

The Red Raiders brought a 3–0 record and #25 AP ranking into their home game against Texas State, but the Texas Tech offensive struggled early against the Bobcats. The Red Raiders got a pair of field goals by Ryan Bustin in the first half, along with a defensive touchdown from linebacker Will Smith, as they took a 13–0 halftime lead. Smith's touchdown came on a 9-yard fumble return, with the fumble caused by defensive lineman Kerry Hyder. Texas State pulled within 13–7 early in the third quarter, and the Bobcats came close to recovering an onside kick afterward. Davis Webb then threw a touchdown pass to Eric Ward to make the score 20–7. Texas Tech pulled away in the fourth quarter, with Webb throwing another touchdown pass to Bradley Marquez. Webb and Baker Mayfield both played at quarterback for the Red Raiders, with Mayfield starting the game before being replaced by Webb in the second quarter.

at Kansas 

The Texas Tech Red Raiders improved to 5–0 for the first time since 2008 with their rout of the Kansas Jayhawks, who lost their 22nd straight Big 12 game. The Jayhawks took a 10–0 lead after the first quarter, with the Red Raiders unable to get on the scoreboard until Ryan Bustin's 23-yard field goal early in the second quarter. The Red Raiders finally got rolling after that, however, scoring on a Kenny Williams touchdown run and a 19-yard touchdown run by Baker Mayfield, along with another field goal from Bustin, to make the halftime score 20–10. The Red Raiders got a pair of touchdown runs from DeAndre Washington in the third quarter, but starting quarterback Baker Mayfield was forced to leave the game in the third quarter with an injury.  Backup quarterback Davis Webb tossed a pair of fourth quarter touchdown passes to senior Eric Ward and freshman Dylan Cantrell as the Red Raiders ended up posting 54 straight points, before the Jayhawks finally scored late in the game to break Texas Tech's scoring streak. Mayfield completed 33 of 51 passes for 368 yards before suffering the leg injury. With the win, the Red Raiders improved to 14–1 all time against the Jayhawks, and the Red Raiders moved up to #20 in the AP rankings.

Iowa State 

The 5–0 Red Raiders returned home for a Big 12 contest against the Iowa State Cyclones, which came into the game with a 1–3 record and an 0–1 record in conference play. Texas Tech freshman quarterback Davis Webb started his first game as a Red Raider, throwing for 415 yards and three touchdowns, with one interception. The game was close through the first three quarters, with Texas Tech opening the game with a touchdown pass from Webb to Jakeem Grant on the Red Raiders' first possession. However, the Cyclones scored on a 95-yard kickoff return to tie the score early in the first quarter. Webb threw a touchdown pass to Eric Ward, and Kenny Williams scored on a 1-yard touchdown run as Texas Tech and Iowa State went into halftime tied 21–21. Webb connected with Bradley Marquez on a 12-yard touchdown pass in the third quarter, which ended with Texas Tech leading 28–21. DeAndre Washington and SaDale Foster had touchdown runs in the fourth quarter as Texas Tech held on for the victory, although the Red Raiders had to recover an ISU onside kick attempt with just under two minutes remaining to secure the victory. In the game, the Red Raiders lost two fumbles and threw one interception, while failing to force any turnovers on defense. Texas Tech ended up with 666 yards of total offense to just 311 for Iowa State, with the turnovers helping Iowa State to keep the game close.

at West Virginia 

Undefeated and ranked #16 by the Associated Press, the Red Raiders traveled to Morgantown to face 3–3 West Virginia. The matchup was a reunion of sorts, as West Virginia head coach Dana Holgorsen was an assistant at Texas Tech from 2000 to 2007, during the quarterback tenure of Kliff Kingsbury (1999–2002). The Red Raiders got out to a quick 13–0 lead, with a pair of field goals by Ryan Bustin and a 10-yard touchdown pass from Davis Webb to Jace Amaro. The Mountaineers then went on a 27–3 scoring run, taking a 27–16 lead in the third quarter. Texas Tech faced a crucial third down play in the third quarter at the West Virginia 43-yard line, and Webb connected with Jace Amaro for a 32-yard gain to put Texas Tech deep in Mountaineer territory. Kenny Williams completed the drive with a touchdown run to pull Texas Tech to within 27–23. Texas Tech took the lead in the fourth quarter on another touchdown run by Kenny Williams, and the Red Raiders extended their lead to 37–27 on a touchdown pass from Webb to Amaro on their final possession to put the game away. Webb ended up breaking Texas Tech's freshman passing record for a single game with 462 yards, hitting 36 of 50 passes for two touchdowns and no interceptions. Texas Tech's defense totally shut down the Mountaineer offense in the fourth quarter, forcing the Mountaineers to punt on four straight possessions in the second half. After starting the season 7–0, this would be the last game the Red Raiders would win in the 2013 regular season. After their win, this would be the highest rank for Texas Tech in the 2013 season at #10 in both the AP and BCS overall standings and #9 in the USA Today coaches poll.

at Oklahoma 

This was the first ranked team Texas Tech played since facing the TCU Horned Frogs in week 3. The Red Raiders jumped out in front 7–0 on a trick play pass from Kenny Williams to Eric Ward, but Tech was denied another scoring chance in the first quarter on a controversial offensive pass interference call against Jakeem Grant. Tech fell behind 21–7, but stormed back to lead 24–21 late in through the third quarter. Davis Webb threw third-quarter touchdown passes to Eric Ward and Jakeem Grant as Tech took the lead with 3:08 left in the third quarter. However, the Sooners took advantage of three Tech turnovers to pull away for the win. Webb completed 33 of 53 passes for 385 yards, but with two interceptions. With the loss, the Red Raiders' season record fell to 7–1 and they dropped to #15 in the BCS rankings.

Oklahoma State 

The Red Raiders were looking to bounce back after their first loss of the 2013 season in the previous week to OU. The Red Raiders hosted the OSU Cowboys and experienced a dismal first quarter, with OSU leading 21–3. The Red Raiders came back in the 2nd quarter to make the game close at halftime. Pete Robertson returned an interception 21 yards for a touchdown, and Eric Ward pulled in a 38-yard touchdown pass. The Raiders scored on a 2-yard touchdown run by Kenny Williams to trail 28–24 going into halftime. The Red Raiders experienced a dismal second half offensively and defensively, scoring only on a short touchdown pass from Davis Webb to Jace Amaro and on a Ryan Bustin field goal. With their second consecutive loss, the Red Raiders dropped to #25 in the AP polls.

Kansas State 

After losing to unranked Kansas State, Texas Tech fell out of the BCS rankings and dropped to 7–3.

vs. Baylor 

The Baylor Bears and the Texas Tech Red Raiders met at the mutual site of AT&T Stadium in Arlington, TX, home of the Dallas Cowboys.

Texas 

With the loss, the Red Raiders fell to 7–5, losing 5 in a row.

vs. Arizona State (Holiday Bowl) 

After losing their last five games of the regular season, the Red Raiders were expected to lose to the Sun Devils. ESPN broadcasts during 2013 bowl games included a prediction that Texas Tech would lose by 22 points, based on computer models. Las Vegas odds makers also favored an Arizona State victory by a line of up to 14 points. In an unexpected turn, Texas Tech got the upset and won their first game since October 19 against West Virginia. Davis Webb threw for 403 yards and tied the Holiday Bowl record with four touchdown passes.

The Red Raiders opened the scoring on a 1-yard touchdown pass from Webb to Rodney Hall on their first possession, capping a 77-yard drive. It was Hall's first catch of the year from his fullback position. Webb also threw two first-half touchdown passes to Jakeem Grant and a touchdown pass to Bradley Marquez as the Red Raiders opened a 27–13 halftime lead.  The Sun Devils scored on their opening possession of the second half to pull within one touchdown at 27–20, but the Red Raiders struck back immediately when freshman Reginald Davis ran back the ensuing kickoff 90 yards for a touchdown. Ryan Bustin's 23-yard field goal late in the third quarter extended Texas Tech's lead to 37–20. Arizona State added a field goal in the fourth quarter to make it 37–23, but Texas Tech cornerback Justis Nelson intercepted a Sun Devil pass late in the quarter to end Arizona State's final scoring threat.

The Red Raiders finished their 2013 season with an 8–5 record.

Rankings

Depth chart

Notes

References 

Texas Tech
Texas Tech Red Raiders football seasons
Holiday Bowl champion seasons
Texas Tech Red Raiders football